Yenipelitcik is a village in the central district of Bolu, Bolu Province, Turkey. Its population is 137 (2021).

References

Villages in Bolu District